Albert "Bertie" Edwin Hill (7 February 1927 – 5 August 2005) was a British equestrian who competed at three Olympic Games.

After serving in the Home Guard during the Second World War, Hill became an amateur jockey in point-to-point racing. He went on to represent Britain in three-day eventing, winning a gold medal at the 1956 games in Stockholm along with a host of other international trophies.

In the 1960s, Hill and his wife opened a riding school at Rapscott on Exmoor, training a number of future international riders including Princess Anne and Captain Mark Phillips.

References

External links
 Obituary of Bertie Hill, Daily Telegraph Newspaper, 30 August 2005

1927 births
2005 deaths
Olympic equestrians of Great Britain
British male equestrians
Equestrians at the 1952 Summer Olympics
Equestrians at the 1956 Summer Olympics
Equestrians at the 1960 Summer Olympics
Olympic gold medallists for Great Britain
British event riders
People educated at West Buckland School
Olympic medalists in equestrian
Medalists at the 1956 Summer Olympics
20th-century British people